Amtsgruppe Allgemeine Wehrmachtsangelegenheiten was a division of the Wehrmacht High Command. In 1938-1939 it was designated the Wehrwirtschaftsstab (Military Economy Staff). Hermann Reinecke was made the leader in 1939.

Bibliography

 Christian Zentner, Friedemann Bedürftig (1991). The Encyclopedia of the Third Reich.  Macmillan, New York. 

Wehrmacht
German High Command during World War II